Straight Freak Ticket is an album by the American alternative rock band Love Battery. The band's first album for a major label, it was released in 1995 on Atlas Records. The first single was "Fuzz Factory".

The band supported the album with a North American tour that included shows with Bettie Serveert. Straight Freak Ticket was a commercial disappointment.

Production
Primarily produced by Bruce Calder, the album was recorded in Seattle in the fall of 1994. Kevin Whitworth played slide guitar on some of the album's tracks.

Critical reception

The Albuquerque Journal deemed Straight Freak Ticket "a good, solid, basic rock 'n' roll album." The Seattle Post-Intelligencer called it "a solid, well-produced album of guitar-based rock with catchy hooks and a strong dose of psychedelia." The Arizona Daily Star considered Straight Freak Ticket to be "an excellent album, boasting the spirit of out-of-control rock music focused with the precision of a big-budget recording."

The Santa Fe New Mexican concluded: "If Nirvana was The Beatles of the Seattle Invasion, then Love Battery is somewhere between Gerry & The Pacemakers and Petula Clark." USA Today labeled the album "a psychedelic tour de force and dramatic leap forward,"  writing that "the antigrunge guitar riff-o-rama of Ron Nine and Kevin Whitworth propels the Seattle quartet's most adventurous and listenable tunes to date."

Track listing 
 Fuzz Factory
 If It Wasn't Me
 Harold's Pink Room
 Brazil
 Nehru Jacket
 Perfect Light
 Red Onion
 Sunny Jim
 Straight Freak Show
 Angelhead
 Waylaid
 Drowning Sun
 Silent Treatment

Personnel 
 Ron Nine - Vocals, Guitar
 Kevin Whitworth - Guitar
 Jason Finn - Drums
 Bruce Fairweather - Bass
 Produced by Bruce Calder & Love Battery

References

1995 albums
Love Battery albums